The Merlion Cup was an invitational football tournament that was held in Singapore annually from 1982–1986, in 1992, 2009 and 2019. Participants included full national sides, Olympic sides, Invitational XI's and club teams. After the 1986 tournament, four Canadian players (Igor Vrablic, Hector Marinaro, David Norman and Chris Chueden) were suspended after a match-fixing scandal.

History 
The inaugural Merlion Cup was held in 1982 and was held annually until 1986. The tournament was not held in 1987 due to financial constraints and the planned tournament would have scheduling conflict with the Malaysia Cup. The 1986 edition experienced the worst match attendance since the tournament's inaugural edition in 1982 with only 12,000 people showed up to watch the final between China and North Korea. Two more editions of the tournament were held-in 1992 and 2009.

2016 planned revival 
At the 2013 Football Association of Singapore (FAS) annual general meeting, FAS president Zainudin Nordin expressed intention to revive the tournament. In early 2015, MP & Silva and FAS managed to secure a six-year partnership worth S$25 million. MP & Silva planned to organise the tournament slated in January 2016 at the 55,000-seater National Stadium. However, in late 2015, after six months of negotiations, it was announced that negotiation to use the National Stadium as the venue of the Merlion Cup was stalled due to the Singapore Sports Hub demanding an upfront payment reportedly a six-digit figure to rent the stadium as the venue of two editions of the tournament in 2016 and 2017. This led the organisers to find an alternative venue and also considered holding the tournament in Malaysia.

On 25 December 2015, it was announced that the 2016 Merlion Cup is postponed indefinitely. Among the teams invited to participate along with hosts Singapore were the national teams of Myanmar, and the Philippines and club sides Shanghai Shenhua and Yokohama F. Marinos.

2019 return 
On 18 May 2019, it was announced that the Merlion Cup would return, taking place from 7–9 June 2019. It would be an U22 tournament, featuring Singapore U22, Indonesia U22, Thailand U22 and Philippines U22. Singapore U22 would face Philippines U22 while Indonesia U22 would play Thailand U22 in the semi-finals.

Results 

Notes

References

External links 
 RSSSF archive - includes details of all matches

International association football competitions hosted by Singapore
Recurring sporting events established in 1982
Non-FIFA football competitions